Daniel Jeandupeux (born 7 February 1949) is a Swiss football manager and retired football forward.

Career
Born in Saint-Imier, Jeandupeux began playing football for FC La Chaux-de-Fonds. In 1972, he joined FC Zürich, where he would win two Swiss league titles (1974 and 1975) and one Swiss cup (1973). Jeandupeux signed with French side FC Girondins de Bordeaux in 1975. He played for Bordeaux until his career ended when his leg was broken by a tackle on 1 October 1977.

Jeandupeux made 35 appearances and scored two goals for the Switzerland national football team from 1969 to 1977.

Jeandupeux last managed Ligue 1 Le Mans UC72, replacing Yves Bertucci in February 2009. He was replaced in May by Arnaud Cormier, but stayed at the club as president's advisor. Jeandupeux has also had spells managing  other French sides — SM Caen, Toulouse, and RC Strasbourg. As well as having managed Swiss sides FC Sion and FC Zürich, and the Swiss national team.

Statistics

Manager

References

External links

1949 births
Living people
People from the Bernese Jura
Association football forwards
Swiss men's footballers
Switzerland international footballers
FC Zürich players
FC Girondins de Bordeaux players
Ligue 1 players
Swiss football managers
FC Sion managers
FC Zürich managers
Toulouse FC managers
RC Strasbourg Alsace managers
Switzerland national football team managers
Stade Malherbe Caen managers
Le Mans FC managers
Ligue 1 managers
Swiss expatriate football managers
Sportspeople from the canton of Bern